Maria Bulanova (born  October 13, 1998) is a right-handed ten-pin bowler from Moscow, Russia, and is considered one of the top players on the Federation of Bowling of Russia. The youngest holder of the highest Russian's bowling sports rank - Master of sports of Russia of the international class. Russian national team (youth & adult) member since 2012. Champion of Russia 2013-2015, the first in Russian history individual and team gold winner in international youth championships. Fifteen time prize winner of European youth championships (3 gold, 6 silver and 6 bronze). Winner of European Champions Cup 2015. The first Russian athlete to win a Gold medal in an international adult championship. She is a member of team Alliance (Nizhniy Novgorod, Russia) and a member of the Brunswick pro staff.

In September 2013, Bulanova became the youngest player ever to win a European Bowling Tour title, at age 14.

In March 2016 she broke the record over 6 games in singles of European Youth Championships by a score of 1470.

She studied at Vanderbilt University (class 2020) in Nashville, TN. Representing the Vanderbilt Commodores as a part of their Women’s Bowling Team - National Collegiate Athletic Association's National Bowling Championships 2018. 2 times First-team All-American (2017, 2019) and Second-team All-American 2018. The National Rookie of the Year 2017. The Division I Player of the Year 2019. Bulanova included in Russian bowling Hall of fame since 2014 and was awarded the Female Amateur Athlete of the Year 2019 honoree of Tennessee Sports Hall of Fame.

Personal stats
Throws: Right
Hometown: Moscow, Russia
300 games: 3
Highest 3-game series: 809
Highest 6-game series: 1483

Titles and awards
4-time prizewinner on European Youth Championships 2013 (1 silver and 3 bronze medals)
Winner of RedExpress Russian Open 2013 (12th step of European Bowling Tour)
Champion of Russia 2013
Champion of European Youth Championship 2014 in singles and team events, silver in all events
Champion of Russia on Russian Team Championships 2014 in all women events - doubles, trios, teams and individual all event
3rd place on 5th Russian Open 2014 (13th step of EBT)
4th place and special prize for best women result (299) in one game on 50th Bowling World Cup 2014. 
Champion of Russia 2014. 
Winner of 2nd Hurghada Open 
4-time prizewinner on European Youth Championships 2015 (1 silver and 3 bronze medals)
Champion of Russia on Russian Championships 2015 in all women events - singles, doubles, trios, teams and all events. Rolled the lone women's 300.
Winner of European Champions Cup 2015
3rd place on 51st Bowling World Cup 2015
Champion of European Youth Championship 2016 in singles, silver in all events, teams and masters.
Owner of the European Tenpin Bowling Federation's record over 6 games in Singles of European Youth Championships by a score of 1470.
Vice-champion on European Champions Cup 2016 
Southland Bowling League Bowler of the Month for December 2016 
In the season 2016–2017 was named first-team All-American and the national Rookie of the Year 
In the season 2017–2018 was named second-team All-American
National Collegiate Athletic Association Bowling National Champion 2018
Southland Bowling League Bowler of the Month for October 2018 
Southland Bowling League Bowler of the Month for February 2019 
In the season 2018–2019 was named Southland Bowling League Player of the Year and All-Conference First Team
In the season 2018–2019 was named the Division I Player of the Year and first-team All-American
In 2019 was awarded the Female Amateur Athlete of the Year 2019 honoree of Tennessee Sports Hall of Fame
Southland Bowling League Bowler of the Month for January 2020

References

External links 
Profile on Brunswick pro staff page
Facebook page
Vanderbilt Women's Bowling page

Sources
 http://www.bowlwithbrunswick.com/pros/maria-bulanova
 http://russianbowling.ru
 http://www.bowling.ru
http://www.bowlingdigital.com
http://talktenpin.co.uk
https://web.archive.org/web/20170921123325/http://rusbowling.com/
https://web.archive.org/web/20140427045258/http://bowlingnn.ru/
http://www.bowlersjournal.com
https://vucommodores.com/sports/wbowl/

Pictures

Russian ten-pin bowling players
Sportspeople from Moscow
Sportspeople from Nizhny Novgorod
1998 births
Living people